William Armour may refer to:

 Bill Armour (1869–1922), American baseball player and manager
 William Allan Armour (1880–1967), New Zealand school principal and educationalist